Lustleigh station was on the Moretonhampstead and South Devon Railway serving the village of Lustleigh, Devon, England.

Lustleigh was the penultimate station on this 12.3 mile (20 km) branchline off the South Devon Main Line. It had a single platform and one siding. The platform survives and the station building has been greatly enlarged.

The Moretonhampstead and South Devon Railway company was formed in 1861, and work on the line commenced in 1863. The line opened to the public in 1866 and converted from broad gauge to standard gauge in 1892.

The station was host to a GWR camp coach from 1934 to 1939. A camping coach was also positioned here by the Western Region from 1952 to 1958.

The station closed to passengers after the last train on 28 February 1959, with goods trains continuing until 1964. The station was used on 28 February 1931 for the film The Hound of the Baskervilles, its name being temporarily changed to Baskerville.

References
Notes

Sources

 
 
 
Further reading

External links

Disused railway stations in Devon
Railway stations in Great Britain opened in 1866
Railway stations in Great Britain closed in 1959
Former Great Western Railway stations
1866 establishments in England